Mack Island is a small island in Hinlopen Strait. It is part of the Rønnbeck Islands in the Svalbard archipelago. It lies east of Cape Weyprecht on Spitsbergen.

The wildlife consists largely of polar bears.

The island was discovered in 1867 by the Swedish-Norwegian polar explorer Nils Fredrik Rønnbeck. The Rønnbeck Islands are named after Norwegian seal hunters, and this one is named after the Norwegian sealing captain Fridrich "Fritz" Christian Mack (1836–1876), who also made several important discoveries in the Arctic.

References

Islands of Svalbard
Seal hunting